In game theory, a multi-stage game is a sequence of several simultaneous games played one after the other. This is a generalization of a repeated game: a repeated game is a special case of a multi-stage game, in which the stage games are identical.

Multi-Stage Game with Different Information Sets 
As an example, consider a two-stage game in which the stage game in Figure 1 is played in each of two periods:

The payoff to each player is the simple sum of the payoffs of both games. 

Players cannot observe the action of the other player within a round; however, at the beginning of Round 2, Player 2 finds out about Player 1's action in Round 1, while Player 1 does not find out about Player 2's action in Round 1.

For Player 1, there are  strategies.

For Player 2, there are  strategies.

The extensive form of this multi-stage game is shown in Figure 2:

In this game, the only Nash Equilibrium in each stage is (B, b).

(BB, bb) will be the Nash Equilibrium for the entire game.

Multi-Stage Game with Changing Payoffs 
In this example, consider a two-stage game in which the stage game in Figure 3 is played in the first period and the game in Figure 4 is played in the second:

The payoff to each player is the simple sum of the payoffs of both games. 

Players cannot observe the action of the other player within a round; however, at the beginning of Round 2, both players find out about the other's action in Round 1. 

For Player 1, there are  strategies.

For Player 2, there are  strategies.

The extensive form of this multi-stage game is shown in Figure 5:

Each of the two stages has two Nash Equilibria: which are (A, a), (B, b), (X, x), and (Y, y).

If the complete contingent strategy of Player 1 matches Player 2 (i.e. AXXXX, axxxx), it will be a Nash Equilibrium. There are 32 such combinations in this multi-stage game. Additionally, all of these equilibria are subgame-perfect.

References 

 

Game theory game classes